The Kilmarnock Standard is a Scottish weekly newspaper published every Wednesday in the town of Kilmarnock.

External links 
Kilmarnock Standard website

Newspapers published in Scotland
Newspapers published by Reach plc